Ego eimi "I am", "I exist", is the first person singular present active indicative of the verb "to be" in ancient Greek. The use of this phrase in some of the uses found in the Gospel of John is considered to have theological significance by many Christians.

Classical Greek
When used as a copula, with a predicate, "I am X", then usage is equivalent to English.

When used alone, without a predicate, "I am", "he is", "they are", typically mean "I exist" etc.
Homer Odyssey 15:433 ‘Wouldest thou then return again with us to thy home, that thou mayest see the high-roofed house of thy father and mother, and see them too? For of a truth they still live (eisi, 3rd person plural of eimi), and are accounted rich.’

This is so unless there is an implied predicate in immediate context.

Koine Greek
Use without a predicate in Hellenistic Greek is largely consistent with earlier 'classical' use, even in Jewish texts:
Septuagint Exodus 3:14 "And God spoke to Moses, saying, I am (ego eimi) THE BEING; and he said, Thus shall ye say to the children of Israel, THE BEING has sent me to you."
Septuagint 2 Samuel 2:19 And Asahel pursued Abner, and as he went, he turned neither to the right hand nor to the left from following Abner. 20 Then Abner looked behind him and said, “Is that you, Asahel?” And he answered, "I am" (ego eimi) i.e. “It is I.” Note: But in the original language of Hebrew, what is translated here as "ego eimi" is an entirely different word than in Exodus 3:14.
Gospel of John 9:8-9 The neighbours and those who had seen him before as a beggar were saying, “Is this not the man who used to sit and beg?” Some said, “It is he.” Others said, “No, but he is like him.” He kept saying, “I am he.” (ego eimi)

Christian exegesis

Patristic exegesis
Ambrose (ca. 340-400) took "I am" not as merely related to Abraham, but a statement including from before Adam. In his Exposition of the Christian Faith, Book III wrote: "In its extent, the preposition “before” reaches back into the past without end or limit, and so “Before Abraham was, [ἐγώ εἰμι]” clearly need not mean “after Adam,” just as “before the Morning Star” need not mean “after the angels.” But when He said “before [πριν],” He intended, not that He was included in any one's existence, but that all things are included in His, for thus it is the custom of Holy Writ to show the eternity of God.

John Chrysostom (ca. 349-407) attached more theological significance to ego eimi, In his 55th Homily on John: "But wherefore said He not, Before Abraham was, "I was" (ἐγώ ἦν), instead of "I Am" (ἐγώ εἰμι)? As the Father uses this expression, I Am (ἐγώ εἰμι), so also does Christ; for it signifies continuous Being, irrespective of all time. On which account the expression seemed to them to be blasphemous."

Modern Evangelical exegesis
The texts of particular uses of interest to many Christians are the series in Gospel of John 4:26, 6:20, 8:24, 8:28, 8:58, (excluding the man born blind, John 9:9) 13:19, 15:1, 18:5, which collectively are often identified as John's "'I am' statements".

In Protestant commentaries it is often stated that "whenever John reports Jesus as saying ego eimi, a claim to deity is implicit." In commentaries the English "I am" is sometimes capitalised "I AM" to demonstrate a connection with how the English Bibles often capitalize words where the Hebrew text has the Tetragrammaton (YHWH), e.g. as the use of "LORD" in the King James Version. For example; "These mighty words come from the Greek words ego eimi, which is more accurately translated, "I AM!". This is also found in some Catholic commentaries. This connection is made because it is assumed that ego eimi is related to I am that I am or Hebrew Ehyeh-Asher-Ehyeh in Exodus 3:14.

Catholic
Modern Catholic scholarship also tends to see a theophany presented in the preponderance of the "I am" statements in the Gospels. Raymond Brown sees a play on words in the story recounted in John 6:20 where the disciples in the boat are terrified when they see a man walking towards them on the water, and Jesus reassures them, ‘I AM; do not be afraid.’ Brown sees a twofold meaning: the obvious story line meaning of 'it is I' and a higher sacral meaning inherent in Jesus' walking calmly on the storm-tossed waves and then bringing them safely ashore.

Other views
This assumption is questioned by those who point out that in the Septuagint and in Philo's Life of Moses Greek ho on "the being", not ego eimi "I am", carries the greater part of the meaning. Also that ho on "who is" occurs in Revelation 1:4,8 4:8, 11:17, 16:5.

Grammatical issues

Predicate
The absence of an immediate predicate ("I am X") may still require an implied predicate. For example A.T. Robertson in discussing John 8:24 notes the lack of a predicate after the copula eimi. But identifies either an implied predicate:
"either "that I am from above" (verse 23), "that I am the one sent from the Father or [I am] the Messiah" (7:18,28), "that I am the Light of the World" (8:12), "that I am the Deliverer from the bondage of sin" (8:28,31f.,36),
or:
"that I am" without supplying a predicate in the absolute sense as the Jews (De 32:39) used the language of Jehovah (cf. Isa 43:10 where the very words occur; hina pisteusete hoti ego eimi). K. L. McKay considers the John "I am" statements to be primarily normal use with predicate, "I am X", "I am the true vine" etc.

Verbal tense and aspect

"...I am"
It is generally considered, for example by Daniel B. Wallace, that if that the intention of John was to state "I was" then the text should instead contain the corresponding past tense form which is ego ēn "I was", as in English and elsewhere in the New Testament.
 KJV (1611) RV, RSV, NRSV, ESV, NIV: "Before Abraham was, I am."
 ASV, NASB (1995): "before Abraham was born, I am."
 The Passion Translation "I have existed long before Abraham was born, for I AM!”
  YLT "Verily, verily, I say to you, Before Abraham's coming -- I am"
  NKJV "Most assuredly, I say to you, before Abraham was, I AM." (Good News Translation GNT; International Standard Version ISV; Phillips; Jubillee Bible 2000; Modern English Version MEV and other translations render it in capital letters "I AM" as well,  to indicate the Title element)

"...I have been"
However in John 8:58 a few Bibles have renderings of eimi in past tenses:

 The United Bible Societies Hebrew New Testament has ani hayiti "I was" not ani hu "I am".
 George R. Noyes, Unitarian - The New Testament (Boston, 1871). "Before Abraham was born I was already what I am" and (in the 1904 edition) "I was"
 The Twentieth Century New Testament (TCNT) supervised by J. Rendel Harris and Richard Francis Weymouth (Britain, 1900). "I have existed before Abraham was born"
 James Moffatt, The Bible A New Translation (New York, 1935). "I am here – and I was before Abraham!"
 J. M. P. Smith and E. J. Goodspeed An American Translation (1935) "I existed before Abraham was born!"
 The New World Translation (1950, 1984) "before Abraham came to be, I have been."; (2013) "before Abraham came into existence, I have been."
 J. A. Kleist S.J. and J. L. Lilly C.M., Roman Catholic - The New Testament (Milwaukee, 1956). "I was before Abraham"
 William F. Beck, Lutheran - The New Testament in the Language of Today (St. Louis, 1963). "I was in existence before Abraham was ever born"
 Kenneth N. Taylor, The Living Bible (Wheaton, 1979). "I was in existence before Abraham was ever born!"
 The poet Richard Lattimore, The Four Gospels and the Revelation (New York, 1979). "I existed before Abraham was born"
 ed. Stanley L. Morris, The Simple English Bible (1981) "I was alive before Abraham was born"
 C. B. Williams, The New Testament in the Language of the People (Nashville, 1986). "I most solemnly say to you, I existed before Abraham was born." 

This reading is supported by a minority of modern scholars:

Jason BeDuhn, cites Herbert Weir Smyth's grammar which shows examples in classical narratives of where a use of Greek present can be translated by English present perfect progressive, and BeDuhn argues for a "past progressive" translation such as "I have been". Thomas A. Howe accused BeDuhn of producing insufficient evidence for the claim that it is an idiom. BeDuhn has objected to Howe's critique, describing it as "a mess of circular argument, special pleading, and irrelevant 'evidence.'" Robert Bowman and BeDuhn conducted a lengthy online discussion in 2005 regarding the translation of this verse. The emails were collated and are available online here.

Kenneth L. McKay considers ego eimi in John 8:58 to be used emphatically as in "I exist" meaning I have been in existence, therefore that Jesus has existed longer than Abraham, and considers John 8:58 "quite unlikely" to be a reference to Exodus 3:14. Against this Daniel B. Wallace replies that McKay's reading would not apply in first person discourse.

Before + participle genesthai
In Greek the structure prin A __, B  ("before A ___, B ___") does not indicate tense in the first verb after prin (before), whether this is "before becomes/became/will become" can only be inferred from the second clause "B " after the comma. For example: prin genesthai "before it will happen" (John 14:29) implies a future "it will become" even though the "I have told you" is past.<ref>"I have told you (eireka humin ειρηκα υμιν) before it happens (prin genesthai πριν γενεσθαι), that when (otan ὅταν) it will happen (genetai γένηται) you will believe (pisteusete) πιστεύσητε</ref>

This Greek structure resembles Wycliffe's 1395 translation from the Latin:Therfor Jhesus seide to hem, Treuli, treuli, Y seie to you, bifor that Abraham schulde be, Y am.''

Sozzini
In the case of John 8:58 since the structure "before" + deponent does not carry any indication of tense in Greek, some have considered that the more natural context of "before γενέσθαι + present verb" would be future, "before Abraham becomes". However the interpretation πρὶν  Ἀβραὰμ γενέσθαι as "before Abraham becomes" is rare, and Fausto Sozzini and Valentinus Smalcius were perhaps the first to advocate the reading "before Abraham becomes [father of many nations] I am [he, namely, the Messiah]".

Calvin
Another consideration, advanced by John Calvin, is the comparison of Abraham 'coming into existence', "γενέσθαι", compared with Jesus declaring his existence with present tense "eimi", implies an eternal pre-existence. " He considers this to be contextually more probable and additionally sees a connection to Hebrews 13:8 "Jesus Christ is the same yesterday and today and forever"

References

New Testament Greek words and phrases